The surname Roma is shared by several people:

In arts and entertainment
 Caro Roma or Carrie Northey (1866–1937), American singer and composer
 David Roma (born 1974), American television producer, filmmaker and entrepreneur
 David Casals-Roma (born 1972), Spanish writer/director based in the United Kingdom
 José Roma (1784–1847), Spanish painter
 Lisa Roma (1893–1965), American soprano
 Paul Roma, ring name of Paul Centopani (born 1960), American professional wrestler
 Spiridone Roma (1737–1781), Italian painter
 Thomas Roma (born 1950), American photographer

In sport
 Antonio Roma (born 1932), Argentine footballer
 Bruno David Roma (born 1989), Brazilian footballer
 Dominic Roma (born 1985), English footballer
 Flavio Roma (born 1974), Italian footballer
 Nani Roma (born 1972), Spanish rally car driver
 Paul Roma, ring name of Paul Centopani (born 1960), American professional wrestler
 Pedro Roma (born 1970), Portuguese football player
 Sandra Roma (born 1990), Swedish tennis player

Other people
 Giulio Roma (1584–1652), Italian Catholic cardinal
 Jean Pierre Roma (18th century), French settler in Canada
 Tony Roma (died 2003), American restaurateur

Surnames
Ethnonymic surnames